On 29 January 2007, a suicide bomber blew himself up killing a policeman and a civilian and wounding 7 others in Dera Ismail Khan, Khyber Pakhtunkhwa, Pakistan. The incident happened during month of Muharram on the day of Ashura, the holiest day of the year for Shi'ites.

Background 
Ashura is the holiest day of the year for Shi'ites as it marks the anniversary of the martyrdom of Hussain, grandson of Muhammad. On the day of Ashura, Shi'ites observe mourning and in Pakistan, they are often targeted on this day.

Bombing 
According to police officials, the bomber was a teenager who refused to be checked at a checkpost and instead be detonated himself. 7 people were injured while two, excluding the bomber, were killed.

See also 
 Terrorist incidents in Pakistan in 2007

Reference 

2007 murders in Pakistan
 Terrorist incidents in Dera Ismail Khan
 Terrorist incidents in Pakistan in 2007
January 2007 events in Pakistan
 Mass murder in 2007
 Suicide bombings in Pakistan